Merry Ruler (foaled 1958 in England) was a Thoroughbred racehorse who competed successfully in the United States. A great grandson of the very important sire, Nearco, he was raced by Harry Freylinghuysen, owner of Merrybrook Farm in Far Hills, New Jersey.

Trained by Eddie Yowel, Merry Ruler competed for three years, winning major races  at tracks in New Jersey and New York. In May 1962 he equaled the Aqueduct  track record in winning the Carter Handicap then in July set a new track record while winning the Gravesend Handicap.

References
 Merry Ruler's pedigree and partial racing stats
 July 29, 1962 New York Times article on Merry Ruler's record win in the Gravesend Handicap

1958 racehorse births
Thoroughbred family 21-a
Racehorses bred in the United Kingdom
Racehorses trained in the United States